Gurr-goni, also spelled Guragone, Gorogone, Gun-Guragone, Gunagoragone, Gungorogone, Gurrogone, Gutjertabia, is an Australian Aboriginal language spoken in Arnhem Land. There were about 60 speakers in 2011, all trilingual in Burarra or Kuninjku.

References

Further reading

Capell, A. 1942. Languages of Arnhem Land, North Australia. Oceania, 12 (4), 364-392.
Elwell, Vanessa. 1977. Multilingualism and lingua francas among Australian Aborigines: A case study of Maningrida. Honours Thesis, Australian National University.
Elwell, Vanessa. 1982. Some social factors affecting multilingualism among Aboriginal Australians: a case study of Maningrida. International Journal of the Sociology of Language 36: 83-103.
Green, Rebecca. 1995. A Grammar of Gurr-goni. PhD thesis, Australian National University, Canberra.
Green, Rebecca. 2003. Gurr-goni, a minority language in a multilingual community: Surviving into the 21st century. In Blythe, Joe and Brown, R. McKenna (eds.),Maintaining the links: language, identity and the land. Foundation for Endangered Languages Conference, Broome, 22–24 September 2003. Bath, UK: Foundation for Endangered Languages.
Green, Rebecca. 2003. Proto Maningrida within Proto Arnhem: evidence from verbal inflectional suffixes. In N. Evans (Ed.), The non-Pama-Nyungan languages of Northern Australia: comparative studies of the continent's most linguistically complex region (pp. 369–421). Canberra: Pacific Linguistics.
Handelsmann, Robert. 1996. Needs Survey of Community Languages: Central Arnhem Land, Northern Territory (Maningrida and Outstations). Report to the Aboriginal and Torres Strait Islander Commission, Canberra.

Maningrida languages
Indigenous Australian languages in the Northern Territory